Viktorija Golubic was the defending champion but chose not to participate.

Katie Boulter won the title, defeating Anna Blinkova in the final, 7–6(7–2), 6–7(6–8), 6–2.

Seeds

Draw

Finals

Top half

Bottom half

References

Main Draw

Engie Open de l'Isère - Singles